The 1991 Kilkenny Senior Hurling Championship was the 97th staging of the Kilkenny Senior Hurling Championship since its establishment by the Kilkenny County Board since 1887. The championship began on 20 April 1991 and ended on 13 October 1991.

Glenmore were the defending champions, however, they were beaten by St. Martin's at the semi-final stage.

On 13 October 1991, Ballyhale Shamrocks won the championship after a 3-16 to 1-08 defeat of St. Martin's in the final. It was their ninth championship title overall and their first title in two championship seasons.

Team changes

To Championship

Promoted from the Kilkenny Intermediate Hurling Championship
 Mooncoin

From Championship

Relegated to the Kilkenny Intermediate Hurling Championship
 Conahy Shamrocks

Results

Group A

Group A table

Group A results

Group B

Group B table

Group B results

Relegation play-off

Quarter-finals

Semi-finals

Final

References

Kilkenny Senior Hurling Championship
Kilkenny Senior Hurling Championship